Nitte is a village in Karkala taluk of Udupi district, in the Indian state of Karnataka. The village is on the way from Padubidri to Karkala. It is 8 km away from Karkala, 26 km from Udupi and 54 km from Mangalore. It is located on the foothills of the Western Ghat mountains and receives very high rainfall.

Demographics 

The language spoken here is Tulu, Konkani, Beary and Kannada. Various communities include the Shivalli Brahmins, Bunts, GSB, Billavas, Mogaveeras, Christians and Muslims.

Education

Primary and High Schools 

 Dr. NSAM high school
 GHPS Borgalgudde
 GHPS Kallambadipadavu
 U B M C Ahps, Kallambadi
 GHPS Kemmannu Nitte

Colleges 

 Justice KSHegde Institute of Management
 NMAM Institute of Technology
 NSAM PU College
 Dr.NSAM First Grade College
 NRAM Polytechnic
 Nitte University

Religious sites 

 Sri Durgaparameshwari temple, Kemmannu
 Sri Ganapathi temple, near Nitte College
 Badriya Jummah Mosque, Nitte-Mangalore Road
 St. Lawrence Church Attur

Transport

Road 
Nitte is well connected by road. There are frequent express and local buses to Mangalore, Udupi, Padubidri and Karkala. The state highway SH-1 cuts across Nitte which connects to the National Highway NH-66 at Padubidri and NH-13 near Karkala. There are buses to Mumbai and Bangalore on a daily basis. Every 10 minutes there is connectivity of buses to major cities like Mangalore and Udupi.

Rail 
The closest railway station is Padubidri-Nandikoor about 27 km from Nitte.

Air 
The closest airport is the Mangalore airport about 64 km from Nitte.

Notable people 

 Justice K. S. Hegde
 Justice N. Santosh Hegde
 N. M. Adyanthaya
 Rakshith Shetty

References 

Villages in Udupi district